Bad Music for Bad People is the second compilation album of previously released material by the American rock band the Cramps. It was released in 1984 on I.R.S. Records and was seen by most fans as a cynical cash-in by the record label, following the departure of the band. Sounds, the now defunct UK music paper, gave the album a 5-star review but said, "Miles Copeland's IRS label pick the carrion of their former label mates even cleaner by releasing a watered down version of the ...Off the Bone singles collection that was released in the UK...The music's still great even if the scheming behind Bad Music for Bad People stinks of decay and corruption".

Track listing

Personnel 
 Lux Interior - vocals
 Bryan Gregory - guitar
 Kid Congo Powers - guitar
 Poison Ivy Rorschach - guitar
 Nick Knox - drums

Notes 

1984 compilation albums
The Cramps albums
I.R.S. Records compilation albums